In the mathematics of moduli theory, given an algebraic, reductive, Lie group  and a finitely generated group , the -character variety of  is a space of equivalence classes of group homomorphisms from  to :

This is the weakest equivalence relation on the set of conjugation orbits, that yields a Hausdorff space.

Formulation

Formally, and when the reductive group is defined over the complex numbers , the -character variety is the spectrum of prime ideals of the ring of invariants (i.e., the affine GIT quotient).

Here more generally one can consider algebraically closed fields of prime characteristic.  In this generality, character varieties are only algebraic sets and are not actual varieties.  To avoid technical issues, one often considers the associated reduced space by dividing by the radical of 0 (eliminating nilpotents).  However, this does not necessarily yield an irreducible space either.  Moreover, if we replace the complex group by a real group we may not even get an algebraic set.  In particular, a maximal compact subgroup generally gives a semi-algebraic set.  On the other hand, whenever  is free we always get an honest variety; it is singular however.

Examples

.

Restricting to  gives a closed real three-dimensional ball (semi-algebraic, but not algebraic).

Then the character variety is isomorphic to the hypersurface in  given by the equation 

This character variety appears in the theory of the sixth Painleve equation, and 
has a natural Poisson structure such that  are Casimir functions, so the symplectic leaves are affine cubic surfaces of the form

Variants
This construction of the character variety is not necessarily the same as that of Marc Culler and Peter Shalen (generated by evaluations of traces), although when  they do agree, since Claudio Procesi has shown that in this case the ring of invariants is in fact generated by only traces.
.

But the trace algebra is a strictly small subalgebra (there are fewer invariants).  This provides an involutive action on the torus that needs to be accounted for to yield the Culler–Shalen character variety.  The involution on this torus yields a 2-sphere.  The point is that up to -conjugation all points are distinct, but the trace identifies elements with differing anti-diagonal elements (the involution).

Connection to geometry

There is an interplay between these moduli spaces and the moduli spaces of principal bundles, vector bundles, Higgs bundles, and geometric structures on topological spaces, given generally by the observation that, at least locally, equivalent objects in these categories are parameterized by conjugacy classes of holonomy homomorphisms of flat connections.

Connection to skein modules

The coordinate ring of the character variety has been related to skein modules in knot theory. The skein module is roughly a deformation (or quantization) of the character variety.  It is closely related to topological quantum field theory in dimension 2+1.

See also

Geometric invariant theory

References

Moduli theory
Group actions (mathematics)